Karmelyuk or Karmaliuk may refer to:

Ustym Karmaliuk (1787–1835), a Ukrainian folk hero
Yuriy Karmelyuk (born 1971), Ukrainian footballer and manager
Karmelyuk (1931 film), a 1931 Ukrainian film directed by Faust Lopatinksy
, a 1938 Ukrainian film with Natalia Uzhviy
Karmelyuk, a 1985 Ukrainian film with Romualdas Ramanauskas
Karmaliuk, an unfinished opera by Kyrylo Stetsenko
Karmaliuk, a 2006 album by Ukrainian band Teoriia Gvaltu